Trenitalia is the primary train operator in Italy. A subsidiary of Ferrovie dello Stato Italiane, itself partly owned by the Italian government, the company and partly from private investors group. It was established in 2000 following a European Union directive on the deregulation of rail transport.

History
The Italian government formed Trenitalia to comply with European Union regulations. The European Commission's First Railway Directive from 1991 (91/440/EC) required separation of accounting between entities which manage the rail infrastructure and entities which provide the actual rail transportation. On 1 June 2000, therefore, Italy created Trenitalia as the primary rail transportation company and on 1 July 2001 established Rete Ferroviaria Italiana (RFI) as the company overseeing the rail network. However, the separation was only formal, since both are subsidiaries of the Ferrovie dello Stato Italiane holding and are owned wholly by the government. Trenitalia operated freight rail services under the Trenitalia Cargo brand until 2017, when Mercitalia took over state-owned freight rail and logistics operations.

As of July 2014, Adria Ferries has a partnership with Trenitalia wherein tickets can be booked at any train station for onward journey to Durrës, at a steeply discounted price with respect to both tickets separately purchased. This is for connections either in Ancona or in Trieste, and continues the historical link between the Via Appia Traiana and the Via Egnatia.

Passenger transport
Trenitalia offers national rail transport in Italy and international connections to Austria, France, Germany, and Switzerland. The company operates both regional and long-distance trains.

Regional trains

Regional trains travel within an Italian region or between neighboring Italian regions, and are subsidized by local government at the regional level by "Contratto di servizio".
Regional trains stop at more stations than other long-distance trains, and some stop at all stations. Regionale veloce (fast regional train) are trains stopping at about half of stations.

There are no reservations for regional trains, and for this reason, there is no price advantage to acquiring regional tickets in advance online. Once bought, tickets for regional trains have to be validated at the station before departure. "Validation" in this case means placing a date/time stamp on the ticket by inserting into a (usually) green and white machine either in the station or along the track. This is because regional tickets are not for a particular date or time but are valid for a period (two months for tickets bought before 1 August 2016). The date/time stamp is to show that the ticket cannot be reused. From 1 August 2016, tickets are valid for the 24 hours chosen by online buyers; the date of use can be changed until the previous 24 hours of the later date. The date of use can be anticipated until the 24 hours following this adjusting operation. The omission about the period of use at paper shops will involve a one-way daily ticket issue. This change aims to hinder fare evasion.

There are no discount schemes available for non-residents of Italy on regional trains.

Long-distance trains and high-speed trains

Long-distance trains are of mainly of two types: the Frecce (arrows) and Intercity trains.

Intercity trains also serve medium-sized cities besides the big cities, thus are generally slower but are cheaper than the Frecce.

Night trains (Intercity night) operate mainly between north and south of Italy and between Italy and its neighbouring countries and are comparable to Intercity level.

There are currently four generations of ElettroTreno in service on the network.

Trenitalia ordered 50 high speed trainsets in 2010.
The new trains are the ETR 1000 series.
Mauro Moretti, at the time chief executive of FS group, said FS was considering long-distance international services to France, Germany, or even Spain and the United Kingdom.
The trains entered service on the Italian high-speed network in 2015.

International passenger trains 

TILO: 50% owned by Trenord (formerly these shares were owned by Trenitalia), 50% owned by the Swiss Federal Railways. The company runs the regional services between Italy and Switzerland. The staff all change at the border and are either FS Trenitalia or SBB CFF FFS. Trenitalia operates all fast trains to/from Switzerland in the Italian portion of the route.
Thello: was a private railway service formed as a joint venture with Transdev. In September 2016, Trenitalia bought out Transdev's 33% shareholding. It operated night trains between Paris Gare de Lyon and Venezia Santa Lucia railway station and daytime trains between Milan and Marseille via Genoa and Nice. In 2020, Thello overnight services between Paris and Venice were suspended in March 2020 due to COVID-19 pandemic, with the daytime train cut back to run between Nice and Milan. In June 2021, all services were withdrawn, with Trenitalia announcing a focus on high speed services between the two countries following the pandemic. The withdrawal was criticised, given the reduction in services between Nice and Milan. Thello was renamed Trenitalia France in October 2021. In December 2021, Trenitalia France launched an open-access service between Paris and Milan, using Frecciarossa 1000 trains. Two trains a day run from Gare de Lyon and Milano Centrale in each direction with intermediate stops at Lyon Part-Dieu, Chambéry-Challes-les-Eaux and Modane in France and Torino Porta Susa in Italy.
Iryo, a high-speed operator in Spain owned by Trenitalia and Air Nostrum, as part of the ILSA consortium. ILSA was selected by ADIF, the company that runs Spanish rail infrastructure, as the first private operator to be granted access to the Spanish rail market. The Trenitalia consortium will run high-speed services on the Madrid-Barcelona, Madrid-Valencia/Alicante and Madrid-Malaga/Seville lines, branded as IRYO. Services will start running in January 2022. The service contract will have a duration of 10 years. The ILSA consortium will offer 32 daily links with a fleet of 23 trains.
Artésia was a company jointly owned by Trenitalia and SNCF, operating trains between France and Italy. It ceased operating in November 2011 after SNCF purchased a stake in Nuovo Trasporto Viaggiatori.

Operations in the United Kingdom
In January 2017, Trenitalia won a bid from the Department for Transport (DfT) to run train operating company c2c from National Express which has a contract to operate the Essex Thameside franchise until November 2029. In the same month it took a 30% stake in a joint venture with FirstGroup, named First Trenitalia, that was later shortlisted to bid for the East Midlands Railway and West Coast Partnership franchises. It was also shortlisted to bid for the South Eastern franchise in its own right.

In August 2017 Trenitalia withdrew from the South Eastern contest, citing a desire to concentrate its resources on its bid for the West Coast Partnership. Likewise in April 2018, along with FirstGroup, it withdrew from the East Midlands contest citing the same reason.

In August 2019, the First Trenitalia consortium was awarded the West Coast Partnership contract. Avanti West Coast ran its first train between London and Manchester on 8 December.

Tickets

Tickets can be bought online, in the stations or from approximately 4,000 travel agencies including those outside Italy. It is common for people to buy tickets from the official website after looking up schedules.

Since long-distance trains, unlike the regional trains, usually require a reservation, it is advantageous to buy tickets in advance. This also gives buyers access to a variety of discount schemes offered by Trenitalia. All "premium" long-distance trains generally share the same discount schemes, even though their fares may differ. Unlike mini fares, which existed before 2012 and required two days of notice, all tickets may be purchased at the last minute if they are still available. All large rail stations have staffed ticket windows and self-service ticket machines for this purpose. Such machines, which either say "Trenitalia" or "Rete Regionale" ("regional network"), differ in the types of payment accepted.

Controversies

Racism
In early 2012, Trenitalia released a web advertisement to promote its change from two classes of train compartments into four classes. Passengers travelling by the fourth class were not permitted to use the on-board cafeteria or enter the carriages reserved for the other three classes. This change alone reportedly caused controversy, but more followed with the release of the accompanying web advertisement. The web advertisement showed only white people seated in the upper three classes, as well as a black family in the fourth.

Italian online media observed this and branded the advertisement as "grotesque". Other complaints of racial discrimination followed in UK newspapers, social media and online. Trenitalia withdrew the web commercial and quickly substituted it following the allegations of racism. Since 13 January 2012 the cafeteria is accessible also for passengers of lower classes.

Trains
Currently, there are several trains that run the Trenitalia service:

Regional trains

Locomotives 

 Electric
 E.464

 Diesel
 D.445

Coaches 

 Carrozze Vicinale a Piano Ribassato
 Carrozze a due piani tipo 1979 (Casaralta)
 Carrozza MDVC/MDVE
 Carrozze UIC-X (type 1997R)
 Carrozze Vivalto (NCDP/CDPTR)

Multiple Units 

 Electric
 ALe 801/940
 ALe 724
 ALe 582
 ALe 642
 ALe 426 (TAF)
 ALe 501/502 "Minuetto"
 ETR 324/425 "Jazz"
 ETR 563 (only used in Friuli Venezia Giulia)
 ETR 421/521/621 "Rock"
 ETR 103/104 "Pop"

 Diesel
 ALn 668
 ALn 663
 ALn 501/502 "Minuetto"
 ATR 220 Tr "Swing"
 ATR 365/465 (only used in Sardinia)

 Hybrid
 BTR 813 (only used in Aosta Valley)
 HTR 312/412 "Blues"

High speed trains 

 ETR 460
 ETR 470
 ETR 485
 ETR 500
 ETR 600
 ETR 610
 ETR 700
 ETR 1000

InterCity 

 Locomotives
 E.401
 E.402B
 E.403
 E.414
 E.464
 D.445

 Coaches
 1° class Gran Confort coach
 1° and 2° class UIC-Z1 coach
 1° class Eurofima coach

See also

Rail transport in Italy

References

External links

Official website 

Companies based in Rome
Italian brands
Ferrovie dello Stato Italiane
Railway companies established in 2000
Railway companies of Italy
Italian companies established in 2000